Bernard Edward Shlesinger III (born December 17, 1960) is an American prelate of the Roman Catholic Church. He was appointed as an auxiliary bishop of the Archdiocese of Atlanta in 2017.

Biography

Early life 
Bernard Shlesinger was born on December 17, 1960, in Washington, D.C.  He attended Mount Vernon High School in Alexandria, Virginia, then entered Virginia Tech in Blacksburg, Virginia After receiving a Bachelor of Science degree in agricultural engineering in 1983, Shlesinger entered the US Air Force as a commissioned officer.  As a pilot, he flew Lockheed C-130E Hercules air transport planes out of Pope Field in Fayetteville, North Carolina.

In 1990, Shlesinger retired from the Air Force with the rank of captain and started studying for the priesthood. He first studied philosophy at the Catholic University of America in Washington, D.C., then went to Rome to the Pontifical North American College.  Shlesinger was award a Bachelor of Theology degree from the Pontifical Gregorian University and a Licentiate in Sacred Theology from the Pontifical University of St. Thomas Aquinas.

Priesthood 
On June 22, 1996, Shlesinger was ordained to the priesthood by Bishop Francis Grossman in Wilmington, North Carolina, for the Diocese of Raleigh.  After his ordination, he was assigned as parochial vicar at St. Mary Parish in Wilmington.  In 1998, Shlesinger was appointed pastor of Our Lady of Guadalupe Parish in Newton Grove, North Carolina, serving there for nine years.  He also became in 1999 assistant director of vocations, holding that position until 2002.

In 2007, Shlesinger was appointed director of vocations and seminarian formation for the diocese.  Between 2010 and 2012, he also served as the diocesan administrator of Maria, Reina de las Americas Parish in Mount Olive, North Carolina, along with two other missions. Shlesinger served in the role of director until 2013. when was named as director of spiritual formation at St. Charles Borromeo Seminary in Philadelphia.

Auxiliary Bishop of Atlanta
On May 15, 2017, Pope Francis appointed Shlesinger as auxiliary bishop of the Archdiocese of Atlanta. He was consecrated by Cardinal Wilton Gregory at the Cathedral of Christ the King in Atlanta on July 19, 2017.

Coat of arms
Based on the arms of Shlesinger's home diocese of Raleigh, North Carolina, by reversing the color to be red on silver (white), is a cross of the faith that is composed of eight diamonds (heraldically called “lozenges”). Upon these lozenges is a gold escutcheon (small shield within the major shield) that is charged with the symbolism of the Sacred Heart. To the lower right, base sinister, is a blue “M,” of the Virgin Mary, taken from the arms of Pope John Paul II.

For his episcopal motto, Shlesinger has adopted the Latin phrase “Christum oportet crescere ,” from John 3:30.

See also 

 Catholic Church hierarchy
 Catholic Church in the United States
 Historical list of the Catholic bishops of the United States
 List of Catholic bishops of the United States
 Lists of patriarchs, archbishops, and bishops

References

External links
Roman Catholic Archdiocese of Atlanta Official Site

 

 

1960 births
21st-century Roman Catholic bishops in the United States
Living people
Pontifical Gregorian University alumni
Pontifical University of Saint Thomas Aquinas alumni
Religious leaders from Washington, D.C.
United States Air Force officers
Virginia Tech alumni
St. Charles Borromeo Seminary faculty
Bishops appointed by Pope Francis